Jaani Dost  is a 1983 Indian Hindi-language action film, produced by C. Ashwini Dutt, M. Arjuna Raju under the Roja Art Productions banner and directed by K. Raghavendra Rao. It stars Dharmendra, Jeetendra, Parveen Babi, Sridevi, with music composed by Bappi Lahiri. The film was simultaneously made along with the Telugu-language movie Adavi Simhalu, starring Krishna, Krishnam Raju, Sridevi, Jaya Prada in the pivotal roles. Both the movies were made simultaneously by the same producer and director, some of the scenes and actors are identical in both the versions.

Plot 

Raja Dharma Raj Singh owner of Raj Nagar estate lives delightfully with his wife Radha. The couple was blessed with a son Veeru and verge to get a daughter. Hereupon, his Dewan Kuber Singh / Cobra deep down a hoodlum intrigues to eliminate Dharam Raj which he distorts as an accident and Veeru go missing in that mishap. He befriends with an orphan Raju who aims to well-educated Veeru, sacrificing his own. Years roll by; Raju is a truck driver whereas Veeru turns into a mobster. He is appointed as a white knight for Cobra's younger brother Hari one that is always under the veil. At a point, Raju saves a charming girl Meena the unbeknownst sister of Veeru and falls for her. In tandem, Veeru crushes on lionhearted Shalu. At once, Raju spots Veeru's true self when discord arises, which soothes by declaring Veeru as an undercover cop. He seizes the entire gangsters around the country, but Hari escapes. Thus, as grudge-bearing, Cobra entraps Raju in crime, forcibly knit Meena with an unknown person by endangering Radha, and seeks to kill her. Just after, Cobra & Hari absconds to a forest where they undertake the malpractice. Therefore, Raju breaks the bars and Veeru chases to hold him. Shalu also accompanies him because she detects Hari as a deceiver of her mother. Knowing it, Cobra attempts to destroy them, but they get away and face Meena eluded from the accident. Moreover, Veeru unearths his birth and realizes Meena is his sister. Now, Raju & Veeru tough nut Cobra in the veil of Jungle Ka Share. So, Cobra sets-up rivalry between Raju & Veeru, and the battle erupts when they fathom the actuality. At last, they cease Cobra and his gang. Finally, the movie ends on a happy note with the marriages of Raju & Meena and Veeru & Shalu.

Cast 
 Dharmendra as Raju
 Jeetendra as Veeru
 Parveen Babi as Meena
 Sridevi as Shalu
 Shakti Kapoor as Naagendra
 Kader Khan as Kuber / Cobra
 Amjad Khan as Hari / Harry / Nooruddin
 Asrani as Ghasita
 Silk Smitha as Laila

Soundtrack

Reception 
The movie was a semi-hit. The ending had weak writing and the action was messed up. The message of Jaani Dost was not lifted up in the movie. The lack of a duet between Dharmendra and Jeetendra limited the acceptance of their strong bond. This was the only movie of friendship where it failed to give message of friendship. The title of the film is misleading with all the songs for both heroes and heroine was by Kishore Kumar and Asha Bhosle.

References

External links 
 

1983 films
1980s Hindi-language films
1980s action drama films
Indian action drama films
Films directed by K. Raghavendra Rao
Films scored by Bappi Lahiri
Hindi remakes of Telugu films
1983 drama films